The Nippon Hospital is a historic hospital building located at 25 S. Commerce St. in Stockton, California. The hospital, which was built in 1919, served the Japanese community in Stockton, which at the time had one of the largest Japanese populations in the United States. Tokutaro Matsumoto, a farmer from the area, sponsored the hospital, which was proposed by a local Japanese community association. The hospital operated until 1930, when it became a hotel. The building is the only surviving structure from Stockton's early Japanese community.

The Nippon Hospital was added to the National Register of Historic Places on September 18, 1978.

References

Hospital buildings completed in 1919
Hospital buildings on the National Register of Historic Places in California
Buildings and structures in Stockton, California
Hotels in California
Japanese-American culture in California
National Register of Historic Places in San Joaquin County, California